The Arch of Augustus is an important monument constructed in the city of Susa, Piedmont, in the province of Turin. It was originally built at the end of the 1st century BC to record the renewed alliance between Emperor Augustus and Marcus Julius Cottius, a Celto-Ligurian ruler who had been made king and Roman prefect of the Cottian Alps. The arch, together with other remains from the period, such as the Roman amphitheatre and a Roman aqueduct, underscore the importance that the city of Susa had during the Roman period.

Description 
From above, the arch forms a rectangle 11.93 metres long and 7.3 metres wide. It rests on two large bases and there is only one archway. The white marble of the arch was sourced from a nearby quarries at Fornesto and Tre Piloni. 

The arch has a unique arcade, in which the archivolt is supported by pilasters. The entablature rests on four Corinthian columns placed at the extremities of each corner, such that a quarter of each drum is embedded in the monument.

The lowest architrave is composed of three bands of which the lowest band is thicker than the middle band, and this in turn is thicker than the top band. Above the architrave, a frieze composed of a bass relief stretches around all four sides. Above that is the cornice which has twenty-two corbels on each face and twelve on each side of the arch. The corbels' panels are decorated with roses. On tob of that rests the attic, which displays an inscription on both faces.

The inscription reads:
 

The frieze represents the sacrifice of the suovetaurilia, a sacrifice in which the victims were a pig (sus), a sheep (ovis) and a bull (taurus) with the animals intended for sacrifice of exceptional size, clearly much larger than the men leading them to sacrifice. The scene has a great number of symbolic meanings, however it indicates above all that the sacrifice is the focus. The man performing the sacrifice is perhaps to be identified with Cottius. On the western side some representatives of the Cottian communities mentioned in the inscription are depicted. On the southern side a second sacrifice, officiated by Cottius, is depicted. On the eastern side the scene has been completely destroyed by the ravages of time.

See also
List of Roman triumphal arches

References

Bibliography

 Michele Ruggiero, Storia della Valle di Susa - Alzani
 Bartolomasi Natalino, Valsusa Antica - Alzani

Ancient Roman triumphal arches in Italy
Buildings and structures in Piedmont
Augustus